Events from the year 1779 in China.

Incumbents  
 Qianlong Emperor

Births 

 Tao Zhu

Deaths 

 Yu Minzhong
 Fang Wanyi